Belkacem Radjef (1909–1989) was born in Fort-National (today Larbaâ Nath Irathen, Tizi Ouzou Province), Algeria and spent 32 years of his life in the fight for Algerian independence from French colonialism.  He joined the first movement for independence, L'Etoile Nord Africaine, in 1930.  He became its treasurer in 1933 and was one of its president's, Messali Hadj, two principal lieutenants and advisors during the 1930s.

He was voted onto the thirty member central committee of the Etoile Nord-Africaine (ENA) and remained in this position through both subsequent renaming of the organization: the Parti du Peuple Algerien in 1937 and the Mouvement pour le Triomphe des Libertés Démocratiques in 1946.  The start of the Algerian War of Independence on November 1, 1954, marked the merger of the military, religious, and political independence associations into the Front de Libération nationale (FLN).  Radjef became a permanent member of this organization's central committee in 1956 and remained so until the Algerian Independence in 1962.

He then joined the new Algerian government as a special attaché to the Minister of Labor and Social Affairs (Bachir Boumaza).  At the same time he founded Le Secours National Algerien, whose mission was to feed, lodge, and educate the neglected shoe-shining youth of the colonial era.  Radjef retired in 1978.

Personal Life:
Radjef had three children with his French wife, Reine Bulot: Tarek, Yamina, and Patrick (né Amar).

References
Cauchois, Elisabeth. MEMOIRE DE MAITRISE: BELKACEM RADJEF, (1909.1989). Université de Paris 7: October 1996.
L'Histoire du Peuple Algerien

1909 births
1989 deaths
People from Larbaâ Nath Irathen
Kabyle people
Algerian People's Party politicians
Movement for the Triumph of Democratic Liberties politicians
Members of the National Liberation Front (Algeria)